Roy Edward Isherwood (born 24 January 1934) is a former English footballer who played as a right winger.

Career
Isherwood signed for Blackburn Rovers in 1957 from non-league club Nelson. Blackburn gained promotion from the Second Division in Isherwood's first season at the club. Isherwood would go on to make 49 league appearances, scoring nine times, during his time at Blackburn. In 1962, Isherwood signed for Chelmsford City for £5,000 as part of a bid to gain election into the Football League. In 1963, Isherwood signed for Altrincham.

References

1934 births
Living people
Association football midfielders
Association football wingers
English footballers
Footballers from Blackburn
Nelson F.C. players
Blackburn Rovers F.C. players
Chelmsford City F.C. players
Altrincham F.C. players
English Football League players
Southern Football League players